Astragalus siliquosus is a species of milkvetch in the family Fabaceae.

References

siliquosus
Taxa named by Pierre Edmond Boissier